Aston Somerville is a small village approximately  south of Evesham, Worcestershire, England.

History

Historically, the Aston Somerville Village has consisted of three individual farms (originally known as the Lower, Middle and Upper Farms), albeit they have usually been farmed as one estate (most notably attributed to the Crowther Family in the 19th century).

St Mary's Church is a grade I listed building dating from the 13th century.

War memorials
The following names appear on the Village's war memorial in St. Mary's Church:
 Percy Baverstock
 Earnest Stock Dale
 Gerald Haines - who is also commemorated on the Broadway War Memorial 
 George Frederick Hoddinot - "Fell at Damery" (also recorded on a tombstone)
 James Pay
 Alfred Perkins
 Leonard Pitman

Recorded on another gravestone in the Churchyard is another World War I casualty:
 Henry West KRR "Missing at Langemarch"
The sole World War II casualty recorded is:
 Geoffrey Norman Wilson (son of Lt Col D.D. Wilson)

Marriage records
As of July 2012, information on marriages in Aston Somerville that occurred between 1700 and 1812 is available on the internet.

References

External links 

 
More information on the Somerville family, the village and St Mary's Church
"Aston Somerville through the Ages" by June Barnet and Val Svendsen

Villages in Worcestershire